This is a list of place names of towns and cities in the Democratic Republic of the Congo which were subsequently changed after the end of Belgian colonial rule. Place names of the colonial era tended to have two versions, one in French and one in Dutch, reflecting the two main languages of Belgium. Many of these place names were chosen after local geography or eponymous colonial figures.

Many of the place name changes occurred under the authenticité programme in the 1960s and 1970s during the dictatorship of Mobutu Sese Seko. In some cases, the names had genuine pre-colonial usage or had already been used unofficially during the colonial period. Mobutu also changed the country's name from Congo to Zaire. Today, European speakers of both French and Dutch use the modern Congolese place names.

Towns and cities

Landmarks and geographic terms

See also

Authenticité (Zaire)
Belgian colonial empire
Mount Stanley

Notes

References

Democratic Republic of the Congo geography-related lists
 
Belgian Congo
Congo, Democratic Republic of the
Congo